The 75th Expeditionary Airlift Squadron (75 EAS) is a provisional Air Force squadron. It was most recently activated in May 2014 in Djibouti, where it provides airlift support for Combined Joint Task Force – Horn of Africa. It replaced the 52d Expeditionary Airlift Squadron. The 75th EAS is a deployed unit, made up of rotating Air Force Reserve Command and Air National Guard units, such as the 910th Airlift Wing, members of which comprised the squadron in May 2022.

The squadron was first activated as the 75th Ferrying Squadron in 1943 it transported cargo.  It was redesignated the 75th Transport Transition Squadron later that year and trained aircrews on transport aircraft until being disbanded the following year.

The 75th was reconstituted as the 75th Air Transport Squadron in 1952.  It operated heavy airlift aircraft, primarily in the Pacific area until 1993.

Prior to its conversion to provisional status it was last assigned to the 86th Airlift Wing at Ramstein Air Base, Germany, where it operated C-9A Nightingale aircraft providing theater medical evacuation airlift in Europe until 2003.

History

World War II
Initially formed by Air Transport Command (ATC) in early 1943 at Homestead Army Air Base, Florida.  Manned primarily by contract civilian pilots, the mission of squadron was ferrying aircraft along the South Atlantic Air Transport Route through the Caribbean to Brazil; then to Africa and then to combat airfields in Europe, Middle East, India or Australia.   Redesignated as a training squadron in June 1943.   Provided transition training in a wide variety of aircraft to experienced military and civilian pilots prior to them being assigned to ferrying duty.   The squadron was disbanded at the end of March 1944 and its personnel and equipment were transferred to the 563d Army Air Forces Base Unit.

Cold War

The squadron was reactivated by Military Air Transport Service (MATS), June 1952 at Great Falls Air Force Base, Montana as the 75th Air Transport Squadron.   Its primary mission was to transport personnel, equipment and supplies to Elmendorf Air Force Base, Alaska and return to Great Falls.  When MATS ended operations at Great Falls, was transferred to Travis Air Force Base, California, continued Alaska support operations as well as flying airlift operations throughout the Pacific.   It flew routine flights to Japan, Hawaii, Alaska and other points in Asia, including transport flights to Indochina and Karachi in Pakistan.

It was the second squadron to receive Lockheed C-141A Starlifters in 1965. In 1966, the squadron was redesignated as the 75th Military Airlift Squadron (75 MAS). Along with the 44th Military Airlift Squadron, it primarily flew cargo and personnel to United States bases in South Vietnam and Thailand during the Vietnam War. In 1970 began transition to the larger Lockheed C-5A Galaxy airlifter, continuing its mission until the end of United States involvement in Vietnam in 1973.  After Vietnam, the squadron returned to normal peacetime operations throughout the 1970s and early 1980s, supporting United States initiatives throughout the world by airlifting passengers, equipment and materiel wherever needed.  The squadron briefly returned to combat duty in October 1983, when it supported combat operations in Grenada as part of Operation Urgent Fury and airlifted combat personnel to the island and assisted in the evacuation of American civilian medical students back to the United States. In December 1989, the squadron participated in Operation Just Cause, which ended the dictatorship of Panama's Gen. Manuel Noriega.

In August 1990, the 75th MAS provided strategic airlift in support of the massive coalition forces buildup in Southwest Asia prior to Operations Desert Shield; Operation Desert Storm and Operation Southern Watch. These operations helped contain the expansionist policies of Iraqi president Sadaam Hussein. In the wake of the 1991 Gulf War, the squadron also supported Operation Provide Comfort for Kurdish refugees for Kurdish refugees threatened by Iraqi forces. In November 1991, the squadron was redesignated the 75th Airlift Squadron (75 AS).

Aeromedical airlift

In 1993, the squadron transferred its C-5s to other units as part of a re-organization of airlift units and was reassigned to the United States Air Forces in Europe, being assigned C-9 Nightingale medical evacuation aircraft.    It became the primary medical evacuation squadron in USAFE, transporting medical emergencies to Ramstein Air Base and subsequently to the Landstuhl Regional Medical Center.   In 2003, squadron was inactivated.

Expeditionary operations
The squadron was converted to provisional status and redesignated the 75th Expeditionary Airlift Squadron (75 EAS).  In May 2014 it was activated when crews and planes of the 317th Airlift Group deployed to Camp Lemonnier, Djibouti.   The squadron supported Combined Joint Task Force – Horn of Africa.  The unit mission included medical evacuations, disaster relief, humanitarian and airdrop operations.  Operations included movement of the East Africa Response Force to forward positions.

Lineage
 Constituted as the 75th Ferrying Squadron (Special) on 30 January 1943
 Activated on 8 February 1943
 Redesignated 75th Transport Transition Squadron on 4 June 1943
 Disbanded on 31 March 1944
 Reconstituted and redesignated 75th Air Transport Squadron, Medium on 20 June 1952
 Activated on 20 July 1952
 Redesignated 75th Air Transport Squadron, Heavy on 8 October 1953
 Redesignated 75th Military Airlift Squadron on 8 January 1966
 Redesignated 75th Airlift Squadron on 1 November 1991
 Inactivated on 30 September 2003
 Converted to provisional status and redesignated 75th Expeditionary Airlift Squadron on 4 December 2013
 Activated on 28 May 2014

Assignments
 2d Operational Training Unit, Air Transport Command, 8 February 1943 – 31 March 1944
 1701st Air Transport Group, 20 July 1952
 1501st Air Transport Group, 16 May 1953
 1501st Air Transport Wing, 18 January 1963
 60th Military Airlift Wing, 8 January 1966
 60th Military Airlift Group, 6 March 1978
 60th Military Airlift Wing, 15 February 1979
 60th Operations Group, 1 November 1991
 86th Operations Group, 1 October 1993 – 1 October 2003
 449th Air Expeditionary Group, 28 May 2014 – present

Stations
 Homestead Army Air Base, Florida, 8 February 1943 – 31 March 1944
 Great Falls Air Force Base, Montana, 20 July 1952
 Travis Air Force Base, California,  – 1 October 1993
 Ramstein Air Base, Germany, 1 October 1993 – 1 October 2003
 Camp Lemonnier, Djibouti, 28 May 2014 – present

Aircraft

 Curtiss C-46 Commando (1943–1944)
 Douglas C-54 Skymaster (1943–1944, 1952–1953)
 North American AT-6 Texan (1943)
 Cessna AT-17 Bobcat (1943)
 Consolidated B-24 Liberator (1943–1944)
 Lockheed C-36 Electra (1943)
 Douglas C-49 (1943)
 Lockheed C-57 Lodestar (1943)
 Lockheed C-60 Lodestar II (1943–1944)
 Cessna UC-78 Bobcat (1943)
 Consolidated C-87 Liberator Express (1943–1944)
 Boeing C-97 Stratofreighter (1953–1960)
 Douglas C-124 Globemaster II (1960–1965)
 Lockheed C-141 Starlifter (1965–1971)
 Lockheed C-5 Galaxy (1970–1993)
 Douglas C-9A Nightingale (1993–2003)
 Lockheed C-130 Hercules (2014–present)

References

075